Frisa may refer to:

People
 Dan Frisa (born 1955), American lawyer and congressman

Places
 Frisa, Abruzzo, town in the Province of Chieti, Italy
 Loch Frisa, Isle of Mull, Inner Hebrides, Scotland

Other
 Loch Frisa, former name of frigate HMS Widemouth Bay (K615)